Bad Gandersheim Airport is a German aerodrome located in Bad Gandersheim in the district of Northeim in Lower Saxony, Germany.

See also

 Transport in Germany
 List of airports in Germany

External links

 Official website
 Webcam of the airport, view to the apron
 Luftsportverein (LSV) "Thermik" Alfeld
 Luftsportverein (LSV) Bad Gandersheim
 Sportfliegerclub (SFC) Gandersheim-Seesen

Bad Gand
Buildings and structures in Northeim (district)